The Berkley State Forest is a small tract of forest land located near Route 24 in Berkley, Massachusetts. It is owned by the Commonwealth of Massachusetts and operated by the Department of Conservation and Recreation.

References

Protected areas of Bristol County, Massachusetts
Massachusetts state forests